Peter Everitt Mestaer owned two ships named Harleston, apparently in quick succession selling one and buying the other, with the result that they are readily conflated:
  was launched at Ipswich in 1811 for Mestaer. She made one voyage under charter to the British East India Company. Around 1813 she apparently sailed for Bengal and then became a country ship in India; she was still listed with Bengal Registry in 1823, but not in 1829.
  was an American vessel launched in 1810 at Wiscasset, Maine, and probably taken in prize. Mestaer purchased her c.1813, and she became a West Indiaman until she was sold on Mestaer's death. She became a whaler and on her way home from her second whaling voyage was condemned in 1826 at Mauritius as unseaworthy.

Citations and references
Citations

References
 Hackman, Rowan (2001) Ships of the East India Company. (Gravesend, Kent: World Ship Society). 

Ship names